Icho or ICHO or IChO may refer to:
 International Chemistry Olympiad
 Kaori Icho (born 1984), Japanese freestyle wrestler
 Chiharu Icho, (born 1981), Japanese wrestler 
 Icho Candy, Jamaican reggae singer
 Icho Ccollo, Hispanicized spelling of Jichu Qullu (disambiguation)

Japanese-language surnames